Pregnant in Heels is an American Reality television series on Bravo that premiered on April 5, 2011. In September 2011, Bravo announced a second season renewal of the series, with the second season debuting on May 15, 2012. The show has since been cancelled.

Premise
The series follows fashion designer Rosie Pope as she helps expectant mothers through her maternity concierge service. She also owns a couture maternity clothing boutique, Rosie Pope Maternity, and runs MomPrep, a training course for expectant mothers. Employees Hannah and LT assist Rosie with running the store while Rosie designs clothing and helps pregnant mothers with their odd baby needs.

Episodes

Season 1 (2011)

Season 2 (2012)

References

External links 
 
 

2010s American reality television series
2011 American television series debuts
2012 American television series endings
English-language television shows
Bravo (American TV network) original programming
Maternity clothing